Iso H (real name: Carl Henrik Rosenberg), born 11 January 1979, Helsinki, is a Finnish rap musician. Together with his colleague Elastinen, he formed the Finnish rap band Fintelligens.

On 30 June 2005, Iso H was sentenced to six and half months in prison for refusing to enlist in either the Finnish defence force or equivalent civilian service. He started serving his sentence on 20 March 2006 in a labour prison in Helsinki. He was released on 4 October 2006.

He released his first solo album "Lähelle on pitkä matka" on 4 May 2007.

Discography
Fintelligens albums
 Renesanssi (2000)
 Tän Tahtiin (2001)
 Kokemusten Summa (2002)
 Nää Vuodet 1997–2003 (2003)
 Lisää (2008)
 Mun Tie Tai Maantie (2010)

Solo albums
 Lähelle on Pitkä Matka (2007)

Solo singles
 24H (2007)

References 

1979 births
Finnish conscientious objectors
Finnish rappers
Living people
Musicians from Helsinki
Finnish hip hop record producers